CEDAC (Centre d'Etude et de Developpement Agricole Cambodgien/Cambodian Center for Study and Development in Agriculture) is an agricultural and rural development organization set up in August 1997 to work for the development of ecologically based family agriculture, and to promote a cooperative and mutual assistance movement in the rural areas of Cambodia. Initial support came from the French non-governmental organization (NGO), GRET (Groupe de Recherches et d'Echanges Technologiques).

See also 
 Agriculture in Cambodia

References 

CEDAC
 Global Institute for Tomorrow

External links
Official website of CEDAC

Agriculture in Cambodia